"Bound 4 da Reload (Casualty)" is a song by British duo Oxide & Neutrino, members of the So Solid Crew. The track features a sample from the theme tune to the BBC medical drama Casualty, composed by Ken Freeman. The duo had not initially gone the correct route to clear the rights to use the Casualty theme, instead calling a BBC receptionist to tell them they were sampling it. When they signed with EastWest Records, the company cleared the sample. The song was first released in 1999 on white label, simply titled "Casualty".

Released on 24 April 2000, the song peaked at number one on the UK Singles Chart on 30 April 2000. The 12-inch of the single was not eligible for the singles chart due to its length, which broke chart regulations and had instead appeared on the UK Albums Chart, reaching number 71. While the record appeared on Top of the Pops during its week at number one, many radio stations refused to play "Bound 4 da Reload" because of its controversial spoken sample taken from the film Lock, Stock and Two Smoking Barrels, spoken by the actors Tony McMahon and Frank Harper ("Ah! Shit! I've been shot!/I don't fucking believe this, could everyone stop getting shot?").

Track listings
UK CD1 and cassette single
 "Bound 4 da Reload (Casualty)" (radio edit) – 3:51
 "Express da Funk" – 5:33
 "Bound 4 da Reload" – 5:23

UK CD2
 "Bound 4 da Reload (Casualty)" – 4:51
 "Bound 4 da Reload (Casualty)" (remix) – 6:21
 "Bound 4 da Reload (Casualty)" (video)

Charts

Weekly charts

Year-end charts

References

External links
 

1999 songs
2000 debut singles
East West Records singles
Oxide & Neutrino songs
UK Singles Chart number-one singles